Rashid Rana is a Pakistani artist. He has been included in numerous exhibitions in Pakistan and abroad with his works in abstractions on canvas, collaborations with a billboard painter, photographic/video performances, collages using found material, photo mosaics, photo sculptures, and large stainless steel works.

Life
Rashid Rana was born in Lahore, Pakistan. He received a Bachelor of Fine Arts from the National College of Arts in Lahore, Pakistan in 1992, and a Master of Fine Arts from the Massachusetts College of Art in Boston, Massachusetts, US in 1994. He is the head of the Fine Art department and one of the founding faculty members of the School of Visual Arts and Design (SVAD), Beaconhouse National University, Lahore.

Art career
Utilizing such mediums as painting, video, installation, and photography, Rana's works deal with everyday issues encompassing such themes as urbanization, faith, and tradition.

His mentor is Zahoor ul Akhlaq.

His recent international exhibitions include Solo Exhibition, Lisson Gallery, London, Perpetual Paradox Solo Exhibition at Musée Guimet, Paris, France (2010), Where dreams Cross: 150 years of photography from India, Pakistan, and Bangladesh, to the Fotomuseum Winterthur in Switzerland, and Whitechapel Gallery, London, UK; The Empire Strikes Back; India Art Today, Saatchi Gallery (2010) The Power of Ornament, Lower Belvedere, Vienna.

Dis-Location (2007), a major solo in a range of media show of his selected works spread across two galleries, including Gallery Chemould Prescott marked his return to Mumbai after a gap of three years. Underlining the artist's notability on the global art stage, an accompanying note said: "He has come to represent an entire generation of Pakistani Contemporary Artists. Moreover, in the Indian art scene, he is the first artist from across the border to have been thoroughly embraced since the partition era artists such as Abdul Rehman Chughtai and Allah Bux. Working both on major public installations as well as gallery-based works, his art is now some of the most recognizable among artists from South Asia".

One edition of his work, "Red Carpet-1" was auctioned at Sotheby's New York on 16 May 2008 for a record price of $623,000 US, the highest price ever paid for a work produced by a Pakistani.

2011
Rashid Rana, Lisson Gallery, London
Art Dubai, Chemould Prescott Road + Chatterjee & Lal, Dubai
Collectors' Stage: Asian Contemporary Art from Private Collections, Singapore Art Museum, Singapore.
The Rising Tide: New Directions in the Art from Pakistan 1990–2010, Mohatta Palace Museum, Karachi.

2010
Perpetual Paradoxes, Musée Guimet, Paris
Finding India: Exhibition of Contemporary Indian Art, Museum of Contemporary Art, Taipei
Where Dreams Cross: 150 Years of Photography from India, Pakistan and Bangladesh, Fotomuseum, Winterthur
Where Dreams Cross: 150 Years of Photography from India, Pakistan and Bangladesh, Whitechapel Gallery, London
Beyond the Page – The Miniature as Attitude in Contemporary Art from Pakistan, Pacific Asia Museum, Pasadena
The Empire Strikes Back: Indian Art Today, Saatchi Gallery, London

2009
Art Basel, Chemould Prescott Road, Miami
Living off the Grid, Anant Art Centre, New Delhi
View Points and Viewing Points: Asian Art Biennial, National Fine Arts Museum, Taichung
Hanging Fire: Contemporary Art from Pakistan, Asia Society, New York
The 21st Century, the Feminine Century, and the Century of Diversity and Hope, Incheon Biennale, Incheon
Mashq: Repetition Meditation Mediation, Green Cardamom, London
How Nations Are Made, Cartwright Hall, Bradford
Starring the Artist, Indus Valley School of Art and Architecture, Karachi
The Power of Ornament, Orangery, Lower Belvedere, Vienna
Lines of Control (travelling exhibition), Third Line gallery, Dubai; V.M. Gallery, Karachi; Green Cardamom, London

2008
Hong Kong\ Art Fair, Chemould Prescott Road + Chatterjee & Lal, Hong Kong
Critical Studio: Dialogue with South Asian Artists, Macy Gallery, Columbia University, New York
Everywhere is War (and Rumors of War), Bodhi Art, Mumbai
Passage to India, Frank Cohen Collection, Initial Access, West Midlands
Re-Imaging Asia, House of World Cultures, Berlin

2007
Solo show, Art Public – Cabinet P.H., Geneva
Dis-Location, Chemould Prescott Road + Chatterjee & Lal, Mumbai
Reflected Looking, Nature Morte, New Delhi
Shanghai Contemporary, Best of Discovery, Nature Morte, Shanghai Exhibition Center, Shanghai
Face East: Contemporary Asian Portraiture, Wedel Fine Art, London
Moving Ahead, National Art Gallery, Islamabad
Group show: Contemporary Art from Pakistan, Thomas Erben Gallery, New York
The Politics of Fear, Albion, London
Mirror Worlds, Two Rooms, Auckland

2006
5th Asia Pacific Triennale, Queensland Gallery of Art, Queensland
EX-OTICA, Gallery Vitamin, Turin
Artissima Art Fair, Turin
Grid <>Matrix, Kemper Art Museum, St Louis
Lille 3000: Desi Pop, Lille
1st Singapore Biennale, Singapore
Beyond the Page: Contemporary Art from Pakistan, Asia House, London; Manchester Art Gallery, Manchester
Asian Contemporary Art Week, Asia Society, Gallery Korea, New York
Flights of Fancy, Royaat Gallery, Lahore
Mirror Worlds: (travelling exhibition), Institute of Modern Art, Brisbane
Parallel Realities: 3rd Fukuoka Triennale, Blackburn Museum of Art, Blackburn

2005
Identical Views, Chatterjee & Lal, Mumbai
Bitmap: International Digital Photo Project, Loop, Incheon
New Media Art from Pakistan, Artist Village, Kowloon, Hong Kong
Metrospective: Visual Representations of Metro-sexuality, Kitab Mahal, Mumbai
Parallel Realities: 3rd Fukuoka Triennale, Fukuoka Museum of Art, Fukuoka
Subhodh Gupta, Rashid Rana & L.N. Tallur, Bose Pacia, New York
Mirror Worlds: Contemporary Video from Asia, Australian Center for Photography, Sydney
Beyond Borders: Art from Pakistan, National Gallery of Modern Art, Mumbai

2004
Identical Views, V.M. Gallery, Karachi
Identical Views, Nature Morte, New Delhi
South Asian Masters: Old Masters and Young Voices, Alhamra Art Gallery, Lahore
Art Summit IV, National Gallery of Art, Jakarta
KOVIDEO: 1st Durban Video Festival, Kazna Gallery, Durban
Playing with a Loaded Gun, Museum Fridericianum, Kassel
Along the X Axis: Video Art from India and Pakistan, Apeejay Gallery, New Delhi10th Asian Art Biennale Bangladesh, Shilpakala Academy, Dhaka

2003-4
9th Cairo International Biennale, Cairo
Global Priority (travelling exhibition), San Francisco Arts Commission gallery, San Francisco
Playing with a Loaded Gun, Apexart, New York
Miniatures Pakistanises, Maison d’Art Contemporarian Chaillioux, Paris

2002
Around Miniature, Royaat Gallery, Lahore
Around Miniature, Canvas Gallery, Karachi
Painting over the Lines: Five Contemporary Artists from Pakistan, York Quay Gallery, Toronto
Painting over the Lines: Five Contemporary Artists from Pakistan, Indo Center for Art and Culture, New York

2001
Non-Sense, Rohtas Gallery, Islamabad
Crossing the Line (site-specific project at Jackson Heights), Queens Museum of Art, New York

2000
Non-Sense, Zahoor ul Akhlaq Gallery, NCA, Lahore
Context, Barefoot Gallery, Colombo
Another Vision: 50 Years of Pakistani Art (travelling exhibition), The Brunei Gallery, SOAS, London;
Gallery Oldham; Haddonfield Art Gallery; Victoria Art Gallery, Bath

Curatorial projects

2010 	Resemble Reassemble: Contemporary Art from Pakistan, Devi Foundation, New Delhi.

Collections

Works in various public and private collections in Pakistan, India, Canada, Europe, UK and US including;
Saatchi Gallery, Queensland Gallery of Art Brisbane Australia, Fukuoka Museum of Asian Art Japan, Frank Cohen Collection, National Gallery of Art Islamabad Pakistan, Devi Foundation Delhi India.

References

External links
Review of Rashid Rana's work on The Arts Trust Online Magazine
Information from Asia Pacific Triennial
Rashid Rana on ArtNet.com
I am a perfectionist: Rashid Rana on The Express Tribune

1978 births
Artists from Lahore
Punjabi people
National College of Arts alumni
Massachusetts College of Art and Design alumni
Living people
Pakistani art collectors
Pakistani contemporary artists
People from Lahore